The thirty-second series of the British medical drama television series Casualty began airing on BBC One in the United Kingdom on 19 August 2017, and concluded on 4 August 2018. The series consisted of 44 episodes. Erika Hossington continued her role as series producer, however, following her resignation in August 2017, was replaced by Lucy Raffety. Simon Harper began his role as the show's executive producer. Twenty cast members reprised their roles from the previous series. Lloyd Everitt, Crystal Yu, Jamie Davis left their respective roles during the series, while Charlotte Salt reprised her role as Sam Nicholls from episode five onwards. Four new cast members also joined the drama in series 32. The series opened with a two-parter special set in northern France, which was followed by an extended 70-minute special episode.

Production 
The thirty-second series will consist of 44 episodes. Erika Hossington continued her role as series producer, while Simon Harper began his role as executive producer following his appointment in June 2017. Mark Catley, the show's story consultant, was credited as co-executive producer for the opening two episodes, before moving into the role of series executive consultant from episode 3 onwards. In August 2017, it was confirmed that Hossington had resigned from her role and Lucy Raffety, who has worked on the show since 2007, would be replacing her as series producer. Raffety's first credited episode aired on 4 November 2017, while Hossington's final credited episode aired on 9 December 2017.

Former executive producer, Oliver Kent, revealed on 5 August 2016 that the show's production team had planned storylines for the beginning of series 32. Series 32 was officially confirmed on 30 July 2017, with the announcement of a two-part opener special, set in northern France. The special, which was filmed in Fishguard and Cardiff, featured Dylan, David, Louise and Alicia offering their medical talents at a refugee camp. In the special, Dylan bonded with a 12-year-old, Sanosi, and his sister, Mariam. It was reported Dylan was to "[find] himself in a difficult situation over their future". Beck enjoyed not filming on-set and was proud to portray the story, commenting, "The main thing however was the importance of telling this story, which has been slightly forgotten in the news recently, and realising, when you boil it down to one human story, just how relevant it still is." It was also announced that episode 3 of the series would be an extended special, lasting 70 minutes and would feature the results from the inquest into Scott's death.

On 7 September 2017, Sophie Dainty of Digital Spy interviewed Raffety, who confirmed that the show had ceased to use episode titles. She explained that the task of creating titles is "incredibly difficult", which could be proven by the number of reused titles and opined that they made the show feel "dated". Raffety went on to reveal that the show will be airing a "very big, very current, very topical and quite controversial story" as of spring 2018, which will culminate in the series finale. Raffety added that the storyline has divided the crew and the cast, and that the build-up to the end of the series would be "very different in feel". On 9 May 2018, it was announced that episodes broadcast in August 2018 would feature a motorway crash and a petrol tanker turning on its side. The scenes are billed as "unmissable", "dramatic" and "shocking", and were filmed in Yate in Bristol.

On 8 December 2017, Casualty released a trailer previewing storylines airing in Winter, including Connie's battle with a heart tumour, Dylan's alcoholism, Ethan's promotion to clinical lead and an acid attack. The trailer also displayed the return of Zoe Hanna and the guest appearances of Jac Naylor and Sally Hodge. Tom Chapman of Digital Spy also noted that "there is a warming winter glow of festive spirit interspersed between the trials and tribulations of the ED." On 10 May 2018, it was announced that a new storyline, featuring Alicia being raped by Eddie, would begin in May and continue for six weeks. The show worked with Rape Crisis England and Wales for the storyline. Halfpenny felt "a distinct sense of responsibility" for the story and believed that the show had portrayed the story accurately. Katie Russell, working for Rape Crisis, hoped that the story would help detract from the idea that rape is taboo. She added, "Casualty has made efforts to explore this topic responsibly and carefully".

Cast

Overview 
The thirty-second series of Casualty features a cast of characters working in the emergency department of Holby City Hospital. The majority of the cast from the previous series return to this series. Amanda Mealing reprises her role as Connie Beauchamp, clinical lead and consultant in emergency medicine. William Beck and Jaye Griffiths continue as consultants Dylan Keogh and Elle Gardner. George Rainsford portrays specialty registrar Ethan Hardy, who is later promoted to consultant and acting clinical lead, while Crystal Yu plays speciality registrar Lily Chao. Chelsea Halfpenny appears as Alicia Munroe, a doctor undergoing the second year of foundation training and later a specialty registrar in emergency medicine. Charles Venn portrays clinical nurse manager Jacob Masters, who later resigns to become a senior staff nurse, whilst Derek Thompson stars as senior charge nurse and emergency nurse practitioner Charlie Fairhead, who later becomes clinical nurse manager. Cathy Shipton appears as sister, who later becomes senior sister, and senior midwife Lisa "Duffy" Duffin, while Amanda Henderson, Azuka Oforka and Jason Durr play staff nurses Robyn Miller, Louise Tyler and David Hide. Michael Stevenson and Lloyd Everitt star as paramedics Iain Dean and Jez Andrews. Tony Marshall and Jamie Davis appear as receptionist Noel Garcia and porter Max Walker respectively. Emily Carey, Lucy Benjamin, Mitch Hewer and Will Austin also appear as Grace Beauchamp-Strachan, Denise Ellisson, Mickey Ellisson and Scott Ellisson in a recurring capacity.

Following her cameo appearance in episode one, Carey confirmed that she had left the series. Everitt and Hewer made unannounced departures in episode two as their characters left Holby. On his departure, Everitt commented, "By the end of his journey, I discovered more sides to him, which were important to play." Hewitt said he had "the most incredible time" filming with the serial. Benjamin also made her final appearance in the episode, as confirmed by Dafydd Llewelyn, a show producer. Austin made his final appearance in the following episode. Digital Spy announced on 31 October 2017 that Yu would leave the show after four years in the role of Lily Chao. Speaking of her departure, Yu admitted that it was her decision to leave as she has "been away from home for four years", although she added that she had "been offered another year on her contract". Yu departed in episode 11, on 4 November 2017. Davis' final scenes as Max Walker were broadcast in episode 19, broadcast on 13 January 2018. The actor said he enjoyed his exit storyline.

It was announced on 25 April 2017, that actress Charlotte Salt would be reprising her role as Sam Nicholls as part of a "big storyline" airing later in the year. Salt last appeared on the show between 2011 and 2013, and began filming at the end of May 2017. Sam was originally planned to return on 16 September 2017, but instead returned a week later, in episode 5. Following several guest appearances in the previous series, Ian Bleasdale also returned during the series as ambulance operational manager Josh Griffiths, who originally appeared in the serial between 1989 and 2007. Josh returned in episode 5. Producer Lucy Raffety announced that Sunetra Sarker would be returning as Zoe Hanna for one episode in early 2018, following her departure in series 30. Sarker appeared in episode 19, broadcast on 13 January 2018. Recurring cast member Owain Arthur reprised his role as Glen Thomas, the former fiancé of Robyn, in episode 13. He departs in episode 30, after his cancer returns. Pam St. Clement also reprised her role as Sally Hodge in episode 17, for one episode. Rebecca Ryan reprises her role as Gemma Dean, the sister of Iain, in a recurring capacity from episode 24.

On 15 August 2017, it was confirmed that Rosie Marcel would appear in two episodes as her Holby City character, consultant cardiothoracic surgeon Jac Naylor, during the series. Marcel appeared in episode 24 when Ethan asked Jac for help with the performance of the ED. Three episodes later, Marcel reappeared when Jac told tell Ethan that he must uncover the secret blogger's identity. Raffety confirmed that there would be further crossovers between Casualty and Holby City throughout the series. Guy Henry made a voiceover appearance as his Holby City character, Henrik Hanssen, in episode 17. Marcus Griffiths appears in episode 33 as his Holby City character, Xavier "Zav" Duval.

It was announced on 30 July 2017 that actress Sharon Gless would appear in one episode during the series as Zsa Zsa Harper-Jenkinson, the former mentor of Dylan and "a maestro of surgery". Gless called Zsa Zsa "a wonderful character" who she enjoyed playing. She appeared in episode 13. The character of Rash Masum, an F1 doctor, was announced on 11 August 2017; Neet Mohan was cast in the role. Rash first appears in episode 11. The character of Bea, an F1 doctor, was confirmed by Raffety in an interview with Sophie Dainty of Digital Spy. Raffety said Bea is "full of fiest, and full of guts", but suggested that she could change. Producers were still casting the role at the time of the interview. On 3 October 2017, Ben Dowell of Radio Times announced that Michelle Fox had been cast as the character, revealed to be called Bea Kinsella, who is billed as "gutsy and ambitious". Fox made her first on-screen appearance on 3 February 2018. Advanced spoilers for episode 44 confirmed that Bea would depart in the episode. On 17 January 2018, it was reported that Maddy Hill would be joining the cast as paramedic Ruby Spark in Summer 2018. Hill began filming in February and expressed her delight at joining the show, commenting, "Ruby is like no one I've ever played before." She will make her first appearance in episode 41. In a March 2018 TVTimes interview with Raffety, it was announced that Di Botcher had joined the cast as paramedic and operational duty manager Jan Jenning. Jan is billed as "bold, brash and bossy", which makes her clash with her colleagues. Botcher first appears in episode 35, first broadcast on 19 May 2018. After appearing in episode 28 for one episode, actor Joe Gaminara joined the cast as F1 doctor Eddie McAllister in episode 33. Dainty of Digital Spy dubbed him "a competitive, cocky posh boy – willing to do whatever it takes to climb the career ladder" and suggested that he had a "darker side". Cassie Bradley made her first appearance as Leigh-Anne Carr, the mother of Scott's child, in episode 31. Rainsford confirmed that he would be involved in a new storyline for Ethan and would feature in several episodes. She made her last appearance in episode 40.

Main characters 

William Beck as Dylan Keogh
Jamie Davis as Max Walker
Jason Durr as David Hide
Lloyd Everitt as Jez Andrews
Michelle Fox as Bea Kinsella
Jaye Griffiths as Elle Gardner
Chelsea Halfpenny as Alicia Munroe
Amanda Henderson as Robyn Miller
Maddy Hill as Ruby Spark
Tony Marshall as Noel Garcia
Amanda Mealing as Connie Beauchamp
Neet Mohan as Rash Masum
Azuka Oforka as Louise Tyler
George Rainsford as Ethan Hardy
Charlotte Salt as Sam Nicholls
Cathy Shipton as Lisa "Duffy" Duffin
Michael Stevenson as Iain Dean
Derek Thompson as Charlie Fairhead
Charles Venn as Jacob Masters
Crystal Yu as Lily Chao

Recurring characters 

Owain Arthur as Glen Thomas
Will Austin as Scott Ellisson
Lucy Benjamin as Denise Ellisson
Cassie Bradley as Leigh-Anne Carr
Di Botcher as Jan Jenning

Finney Cassidy as Miles Ashworth
Joe Gaminara as Eddie McAllister
Roger Griffiths as Marty Williams
Mitch Hewer as Mickey Ellisson
Tut Nyout as Sanosi Jemal
Rebecca Ryan as Gemma Dean
Kai Thorne as Blake Gardner

Guest characters 

Sasha Behar as Alex Broadhurst
Lin Blakley as Maggie Coomes
Ian Bleasdale as Josh Griffiths
Nicholas Boulton as Simon Feathering
John Paul Connolly as Dougie Kinsella
Sharon Gless as Zsa Zsa Harper-Jenkinson
Marcus Griffiths as Xavier "Zav" Duval
Jenny Howe as Lexy Morrell
Ariel Ivo Reid as Tara Jewkes
Gary Lilburn as Ray Coomes
Rosie Marcel as Jac Naylor
Amy Noble as DC Wilkinson
Sunetra Sarker as Zoe Hanna
Pam St. Clement as Sally Hodge
James Wilby as Archie Grayling

Episodes

Reception 
The first episode of the series, part one of the two-part special, received praise from viewers on Twitter. Viewers enjoyed the portrayal of the refugee crisis and commended the show for highlighting the issue, with comments including, "Well done [Casualty] for highlighting the harsh reality of what refugees go through every single day. It needs to stop" and "A powerful, moving & hard-hitting ep of #casualty addressing the #refugeecrisis." Other viewers found the episode "heartbreaking" and "dramatic" and the cinematography and style of the episode "beautiful" and "excellent". Viewers also enjoyed the bromance between Dylan and David, with one viewer calling it "the best Casualty thing" since Nick Jordan (Michael French) appeared on the show.

Casualty made the shortlist for the National Television Awards 2018, under the drama category. Casualty was shortlisted in the "Best Soap/Continuing Drama" category at the 2018 Broadcast Awards, but lost out to Channel 4 soap opera Hollyoaks. Judges praised the drama for its portrayal of an emergency department, commenting, "Casualty delivered one of the most moving and realistic depictions of the powerlessness of nurses in a crisis situation". Casualty was then nominated for a BAFTA on 4 April 2018, under the "Soap and Continuing Drama" category, alongside Coronation Street, Emmerdale and Hollyoaks. The show was successful, winning the award for the second time. The drama was nominated in the "Best Soap (Evening)" category at the 2018 Digital Spy Reader Awards; it came in last place with 3.8% of the total votes.

References

External links 
 Casualty Series 32 at BBC Online
 Casualty Series 32 at the Internet Movie Database

32
2017 British television seasons
2018 British television seasons